is a volcanic island in the Izu archipelago in the Philippine Sea approximately  southeast of Tokyo, Japan.  As with the other islands in the Izu Island group, Miyake-jima forms part of the Fuji-Hakone-Izu National Park.

Etymology
There are many theories about the origin of Miyake-jima's name. One theory claims a manuscript about the island's genesis called the Miyakeki (三宅記), written by a Shinto priest from the island, influenced the name. The manuscript explains how a deity, Mashima (三嶋), constructed his palace on the island after having built two other houses on neighbouring islands. Each of the houses had their backs facing the palace, thus giving a lined up impression. This belief is known as the 'three house theory'. Another hypothesis says that the shrines on Miyake-jima are historically related to those on Miyajima, an island in Hiroshima Bay. As there are many more speculations, the true origin cannot be known.

Geography
The island is a stratovolcano with a granitic composite cone, dating from the late Pleistocene period, between 10,000 and 2,000 years ago. The island has a roughly circular coastline, 88.3 kilometers in length, with an average diameter of eight kilometers. The highest elevation  is an active volcano with a height of 759.390 meters. The mountain has been recorded to have erupted numerous times throughout history, and is mentioned as far back as Nara period written records. Over the past 890 years, it has erupted 13 times, including five times since the start of the Meiji period. A lava flow in 1940 killed 11 people, and other eruptions occurred in 1962 and 1983. 

On July 14, 2000, Mount Oyama began another series of eruptions, and by September, the island was completely evacuated.  After a four-year period of volcanic emissions, residents were allowed to return permanently on February 1, 2005. After the eruption, there has been a constant flow of sulfur dioxide gas coming from Mount Oyama.
Residents of the island were once required to carry gas masks with them at all times. However, masks have not been needed for years. Alarms go off if there is a dramatic increase in the levels of toxic gases in the air. Volcanic gas emissions from this volcano are measured by a Multi-Component Gas Analyzer System, which detects pre-eruptive degassing of rising magmas, improving prediction of volcanic activity.

Climate
Miyake-jima has a humid subtropical climate (Köppen climate classification Cfa) with very warm summers and mild winters. Precipitation is abundant throughout the year, but is somewhat lower in winter.

Flora and fauna
Miyake-jima is home to an unusually rich flora and fauna with several rare species of birds and animals, although its natural habitats are constantly under threat from human and volcanic activity. 
Underwater, the island is valued by divers for its coral reefs and marine fauna (including the dolphin population outside nearby Mikura-jima). The island has been recognised as an Important Bird Area (IBA) by BirdLife International because it supports populations of Japanese wood pigeons, Japanese murrelets, Pleske's grasshopper warblers, Ijima's leaf-warblers and Izu thrushes (akakokko).

Administration
The island is administered by the Miyake subprefecture of the Tokyo Metropolitan government.  As of June 1, 2016, the population of the island was 2451.  serves as the local government of the island, and also includes nearby tiny uninhabited Ōnoharajima west south-west of Miyake-jima. 

Miyake village consists of the five traditional hamlets of Izu, Kamitsuki, Igaya, Ako and Tsubota, with Tsubota on the southeast coast as the administrative center.

Access
The island is accessible by an over-night ferry called the Tachibana Maru (橘丸), which is operated by Tōkai Kisen. The ferry departs from Takeshiba Pier, near Hamamatsuchō Station, Tokyo at 22:30 and arrives at Miyakejima at 5:00. Depending on the wind and weather conditions, the Tachibana Maru will dock at one of three ports; Miike Port Pier (三池港桟橋), Igaya Port (伊ヶ谷港), or Sabigahama Port (錆ヶ浜港). The port where the boat will dock is not predictable and changes on a daily basis. Generally, the boat will arrive at a port that is complementary with the wind direction. A second large passenger ship named Sarubia Maru (さるびあ丸) will also start servicing Miyake-jima on June 25th, 2020.There are flights connecting Miyakejima Airport and Haneda Airport with an approximate flying time of 50 minutes. Flights are also operated from Chofu Airport. The area is prone to high volume of sulfuric gas and flights were suspended for almost eight years after the July 14, 2000 volcano eruption. Flights resumed during April 2008, after sulfuric gases in the air dropped to levels below 0.2ppm. There is a helicopter that arrives via Izu Ōshima. There are also two helicopter flights operated by Tokyo Island Shuttle which originate in Aogashima and Izu Ōshima and fly to Toshima, Miyake-jima, Mikura-jima, Hachijō-jima and Aogashima.

There are two bus routes on the island. Both bus routes service the same stops, but one route goes clockwise and the other route goes counter-clockwise. The time between each bus stop arrival can vary greatly from a few minutes to up to 3 hours.

See also

 List of volcanoes in Japan
 List of islands of Japan
 Izu Islands
 Devil's Sea
 Jack Moyer (1929-2004), former resident and marine biologist
Two Car (2017), an animated television series set in Miyake-jima

References

 Teikoku's Complete Atlas of Japan'', Teikoku-Shoin., Ltd. Tokyo 1990,

External links

 Miyake Village Official Website
 Miyakejima - Japan Meteorological Agency 
  - Japan Meteorological Agency
 Miyake Jima - Geological Survey of Japan
 

Izu Islands
Stratovolcanoes of Japan
Active volcanoes
Islands of Tokyo
Volcanoes of Tokyo
Important Bird Areas of the Nanpo Islands
Seabird colonies
Holocene stratovolcanoes